Mjølfjell Station is a railway station along the Bergen Line in the village of Mjølfjell in the eastern part of the Raundalen valley in Voss municipality, Vestland county, Norway. The station is served by the Bergen Commuter Rail, operated by Vy Tog, with up to five daily departures in each direction, in addition to one weekly express train. The station was opened in 1908. The surrounding area is dominantly recreational, with many cabins. It is accessible by a spur of County Road 307. The station takes its name from the nearby mountain Mjølfjellet.

External links
 Jernbaneverket's page on Mjølfjell

Railway stations in Voss
Railway stations on Bergensbanen
Railway stations opened in 1936
1936 establishments in Norway